Spear is a 2015 Australian drama film directed by choreographer Stephen Page.

Cast
 Hunter Page-Lochard as Djali
 Aaron Pedersen as Suicide Man
 Troy Honeysett as White Man
 Djakapurra Munyarryun as Big Man

Production
Spear was written and directed by Stephen Page, and produced by John Harvey.

Originally performed on stage by the Bangarra Dance Theatre in 2000 under the title Skin, it was reimagined for film using mostly dance and movement.

Release
Spear was screened in the Discovery section of the 2015 Toronto International Film Festival.

It had its Australian premiere at the Adelaide Film Festival in October 2015 and was screened in the Sydney Festival in January 2016.

Awards
Winner, UNESCO Award,  Special Mention – 2016 Asia Pacific Screen Awards
 Nominee, Best Cinematography (Bonnie Elliott) and Best Costume Design (Jennifer Irwin), 2016 AACTA Awards
 Nominee, Panavision Spirit Award for Independent Cinema, 2016 Santa Barbara International Film Festival
Nominee, Best Cinematography (Bonnie Elliott), 2017 Film Critics Circle of Australia Awards
Nominee, Best Cinematography (Bonnie Elliott), 2017 Australian Film Critics Association Awards

References

External links
 

2015 films
2015 drama films
2015 directorial debut films
Australian drama films
2010s English-language films
2010s Australian films
Films about Aboriginal Australians